South Radley is an unincorporated community in Crawford County, Kansas, United States.

History
South Radley was known historically for its coal mining operations.

References

Further reading

External links
 Crawford County maps: Current, Historic, KDOT

Unincorporated communities in Crawford County, Kansas
Unincorporated communities in Kansas